The Hockey Club SKA, often referred to as SKA Saint Petersburg and literally as the Sports Club of the Army, is a Russian professional ice hockey club based in Saint Petersburg. They are members of the Bobrov Division in the Kontinental Hockey League (KHL). The club never competed in a league final until the 2014–15 KHL season, where they defeated Ak Bars Kazan winning the Gagarin Cup. They won their second Gagarin Cup in 2017, defeating Metallurg Magnitogorsk. In 2012, with an average of 10,126 spectators, the SKA became the first Russian club ever to average a five-digit attendance.

SKA is owned by Russian state-controlled energy giant Gazprom. The club used its immense wealth to gather almost all elite Russian KHL players under its umbrella to prepare them for the 2018 Winter Olympics. The success of Russian team in winning gold at the first Olympics since 1994 that did not feature any active NHL players were attributed to players' chemistry developed in SKA.

In 2023, Roman Rotenberg, the General Manager of the Russian team, thanked Russian state-owned Gazprom for their contribution to Russia's victory at the 2018 Winter Olympics.

History

The club was established in 1946 as a top-level club of the Soviet Championship League to participate in its first season. The original name of the club was Kirov LDO (Kirov Leningrad Officers' Club). It was subsequently changed to ODO (District Officers' Club) in 1953, SKVO (Sports Club of the Military District) in 1957 and finally Sportivnyi Klub Armii (Sport Club of the Army) in 1959. During the Soviet era, the SKA (along with CSKA Moscow) belonged to the Ministry of Defense sports club system.

After finishing last in their group during the first season, LDO skipped the next season and was downgraded to the second level of the championship in 1948. The club returned to the Soviet Class A in 1950–51 and remained in the top division of the Soviet league until 1991. The highest achievements of the club during that time were the 1968 and 1971 Soviet Cup Finals (the former was lost to CSKA Moscow 7–1, the latter to Spartak Moscow 5–1) as well as the bronze medals of the 1970–71 and 1986–87 Soviet Championships.

After one season in the second level division of the Soviet League (the first and the only CIS Championship), the SKA joined the International Ice Hockey League established by the top ice hockey teams of the former Soviet Union. During its 1993–94 season, the SKA managed to advance to the IHL Cup semi-finals but lost to that year's champion Lada Togliatti. The club was less successful in the Russian Superleague, which replaced the IHL as the main Russian championship since 1996, failing to get further than the first playoff rounds.

The formation of the Kontinental Hockey League in 2008 marked the beginning of a new era for the team. HC SKA got into their first Conference Finals during the 2011–12 season and finishing first during the regular season the next year winning the 2012–13 Continental Cup.

In the 2015 Gagarin Cup playoffs, after defeating both Torpedo Nizhny Novgorod and Dynamo Moscow in five games in the first two rounds, HC SKA were in the Western Conference Finals for the third time in four years this time facing CSKA Moscow. HC SKA were already down 0–3 after the first three games, but managed to rebound and win the next four straight clinching the series 4–3. This made them the first team in KHL history to win a playoff series after being down three games to none. The team would go on to defeat Ak Bars Kazan 4–1 to win the Gagarin Cup and become the KHL champions, the first nationwide championship in club history. But they could not manage to retain the Gagarin Cup in the following season, as they were swept by 2015–16 Continental Cup winners CSKA Moscow in the Conference Finals and finished in 3rd place.

In the 2016–17 KHL season, SKA drew an average home attendance of 11,735.

Awards and trophies

Team 
Gagarin Cup 
Winners (2): 2014–15, 2016–17
Continental Cup
Winners (3): 2012–13, 2017–18,2022–23
Opening Cup
Winners (2): 2017–18, 2018–19
Soviet Championship League 
3rd place (2):  1970–71, 1986–87

Pre-season
Spengler Cup 
Winners (4):  1970, 1971, 1977, 2010
Motorola Cup 
Winners (1): 1983
Puchkov Cup 
Winners (6): 2008,2015,2017,2018,2019,2021,2022
Basel Summer Ice Hockey 
Winners (1): 2009
Donbass Open Cup
Winners (1): 2011
President of the Republic of Kazakhstan's Cup
Winners (1): 2012
Tournament Hameenlinna 
Winners (1): 2013
Sochi Winter Cup
Winners (1): 2022

Season-by-season record
Note: GP = Games played, W = Wins, L = Losses, OTW = Overtime/shootout wins, OTL = Overtime/shootout losses, Pts = Points, GF = Goals for, GA = Goals against

Players

Current roster

All-time KHL scoring leaders 

These are the top-ten point-scorers in franchise history. Figures are updated after each completed KHL regular season.

Note: Pos = Position; GP = Games played; G = Goals; A = Assists; Pts = Points; P/G = Points per game;  = current SKA player''

Head coaches

  Gennady Dmitriev (1946–47)
  A. Semenov (1950—1951)
  Belyay Bekyashev (1951—1952)
  Georgy Lasin (1952—1953)
  Anatoly Viktorov (1953—1956–57)
  Evgeny Voronin (1957—1958)
  Aleksander Komarov (1958—1962)
  Yevgeni Babich (1962–1963)
  Nikolai Puchkov (1963—1973)
  Veniamin Alexandrov (1973—1974)
  Nikolai Puchkov (1974—1977)
  Oleg Sivkov (1977–78)
  Nikolai Puchkov (1978)
  Valeri Shilov (1978—1979)
  Igor Romishevsky (1979—1981)
  Boris Mikhailov (1981—1984)
  Valeri Shilov (1984—1989)
  Gennadiy Tsygankov (1989–90—1990–91)
 / Igor Shurkov (1990–91—1991–92)
  Boris Mikhailov (1992–93—1998)
  Nikolai Maslov (1998–99)
  Alexander Zhukov (1999)
  Rafael Ishmatov (1999—2001–02)
  Nikolai Puchkov (2002)
  Boris Mikhailov (2002—2005)
  Nikolai Solovyev (2005–06)
  Sergei Cherkas (2006)
  Boris Mikhailov (2006)
  Yuri Leonov (2006—2007)
  Barry Smith (2007—2010)
  Ivan Zanatta (2010)
  Václav Sýkora (2010—11)
  Miloš Říha (2011—2012)
  Mikhail Kravets (2012)
  Jukka Jalonen (2012—2014)
  Vyacheslav Bykov (2014—2015)
  Andrei Nazarov (2015)
  Sergei Zubov (2015–16)
 / Oļegs Znaroks (2016—2018)
  Ilya Vorobiev (2018—2019)
  Alexei Kudashov (2019—2020)
  Valeri Bragin (2020—2022)
  Roman Rotenberg (2022—)

References

External links

  

 
Ice hockey teams in Russia
Sports clubs in Saint Petersburg
Armed Forces sports society
Kontinental Hockey League teams
Military ice hockey teams
Bobrov Division (KHL)